The 1967–68 Polska Liga Hokejowa season was the 33rd season of the Polska Liga Hokejowa, the top level of ice hockey in Poland. 10 teams participated in the league, and GKS Katowice won the championship.

Final round

Qualification round

External links
 Season on hockeyarchives.info

Polska
Polska Hokej Liga seasons
1967–68 in Polish ice hockey